Lake Arpi is located in the Shirak Province of Armenia, on the Ashotsk plateau in the northwestern part of the country. The lake sits at an altitude of 2,025 m with an area of 20 km2. It originates from a volcano tectonic earthquake.

In 1951, the Arpi dam was built to create the Lake Arpi reservoir and artificially increased the natural state of 4.5 km2, 1.6 m deep, and volume of 5 million cubic meters. The reservoir's dam is 10 m high and 80 m long. The reservoir-lake spans 7.3 km long and 4.3 km wide, with an area of 20 km2, 8 m deep, and a volume of 30 million cubic meters.

Lake Arpi has become the second most important body of water in Armenia, next to Lake Sevan. It is used for irrigation and hydropower production. The lake is fed by meltwater and four streams, and it is the source of the Akhurian River.

Conservation
The lake has rich flora and fauna. It is a Ramsar Convention–protected site, and a national park was established around the lake in 2009.During the winter, it is completely covered by ice. In its waters are found Cyprinus and Varicorhinus. More than 100 species of birds have been observed around Lake Arpi, which is why the area was recognized as an Important Bird Area.

References

Lakes of Armenia
Mountain lakes
Ramsar sites in Armenia
Geography of Shirak Province